The women's 500 metres races of the 2015–16 ISU Speed Skating World Cup 3, arranged in Eisstadion Inzell, in Inzell, Germany, were held on 4 and 6 December 2015.

Lee Sang-hwa of South Korea won race one, while Americans Brittany Bowe and Heather Richardson-Bergsma came second and third. Janine Smit of the Netherlands won the first Division B race.

Lee also won race two, with Richardson in second place, and Heather McLean of Canada in third. Kim Hyun-yung of South Korea won the second Division B race.

Race 1
Race one took place on Friday, 4 December, with Division B scheduled in the afternoon session, at 12:00, and Division A scheduled in the evening session, at 17:04.

Division A

Division B

Race 2
Race two took place on Sunday, 6 December, with Division B scheduled in the morning session, at 09:45, and Division A scheduled in the afternoon session, at 15:43.

Division A

Division B

References

Women 0500
3